Saros cycle series 111 for solar eclipses occurred at the Moon's ascending node, repeating every 18 years and 11 days, and contained 79 events.

This solar saros is linked to Lunar Saros 104.

Umbral eclipses
Umbral eclipses (annular, total and hybrid) can be further classified as either: 1) Central (two limits), 2) Central (one limit) or 3) Non-Central (one limit). The statistical distribution of these classes in Saros series 111 appears in the following table.

Events

References 
 http://eclipse.gsfc.nasa.gov/SEsaros/SEsaros111.html

External links
Saros cycle 111 - Information and visualization

Solar saros series